Josip Novakovich (Croatian: Novaković) is a Croatian Canadian writer.

Early life and education 
Josip Novakovich was born in Yugoslavia (in 1956) and grew up in the central Croatian town of Daruvar. Novakovich studied medicine at the University of Novi Sad in Serbia. He left Yugoslavia to avoid service in the Yugoslav People's Army, and moved to the United States at the age of 20. He continued his education at Vassar College (B.A.), Yale Divinity School (M.Div.), and the University of Texas, Austin (M.A.).

Career 
Novakovich has published a novel (April Fool's Day), four short story collections (Yolk, Salvation and Other Disasters, Infidelities: Stories of War and Lust, Tumbleweed), four collections of narrative essays (Apricots from Chernobyl, Plum Brandy: Croatian Journey, Three Deaths, and Shopping for a Better Country); and two textbooks (Writing Fiction Step by Step, Fiction Writer's Workshop) and hundreds of short stories and essays.

Awards 
Novakovich is a recipient of the Whiting Award, a Guggenheim fellowship, two fellowships from the National Endowment of the Arts, panelist of National Endowment of the Arts, an award from the Ingram Merrill Foundation, and an American Book Award from the Before Columbus Foundation.  Novakovich was a finalist for The Man Booker International Prize in 2013. He was anthologized in Best American Poetry, Pushcart Prize (three times), and O.Henry Prize Stories. Kirkus Reviews called Novakovich "the best American short stories writer of the decade". In 2017, Tumbleweed was longlisted for the Scotiabank Giller Prize.

Academia 
Novakovich has taught at Nebraska Indian Community College, Bard College, Moorhead State University, Antioch University Los Angeles, creative writing at the University of Cincinnati, and  Pennsylvania State University. In 2009, Novakovich moved to Canada to teach creative writing at Concordia University.

Works

Books

Fiction

Essay collections

Writing instruction

References

External links
 "A View from Pulkovo," Gulf Coast: A Journal of Literature and Fine Arts 25.1 (2012).
 Josip Novakovich at the Concordia University Department of English
 Cincinnati Magazine, Dec 1998, p. 57

American emigrants to Canada
People from Daruvar
Yugoslav emigrants to the United States
Vassar College alumni
Yale University alumni
University of Texas at Austin alumni
Bard College faculty
Minnesota State University Moorhead faculty
University of Cincinnati faculty
Pennsylvania State University faculty
University of Novi Sad alumni
21st-century American novelists
American male novelists
Living people
1956 births
American male short story writers
American male essayists
21st-century American short story writers
21st-century American essayists
21st-century Canadian novelists
21st-century Canadian short story writers
Canadian male novelists
Canadian male short story writers
Canadian male essayists
Canadian people of Croatian descent
Academic staff of Concordia University
American Book Award winners
21st-century Canadian male writers
Novelists from Pennsylvania
Novelists from Ohio
Novelists from Minnesota
Novelists from New York (state)
21st-century Canadian essayists
21st-century American male writers